Edoughnura is a genus of springtails in the family Neanuridae. There is at least one described species in Edoughnura, E. rara.

References

Further reading

 
 
 

Springtail genera